BlizzCon is an annual gaming convention held by Blizzard Entertainment to promote its major franchises including Warcraft, StarCraft, Diablo, Hearthstone, Heroes of the Storm, and Overwatch.

The first BlizzCon was held in October 2005, and since then, all of the conventions have been held at the Anaheim Convention Center in Anaheim, California, in the same metropolitan area as Blizzard's headquarters in Irvine. The convention features game-related announcements, previews of upcoming Blizzard Entertainment games and content, Q&A sessions and panels, costume contests, and playable versions of various Blizzard games. The closing night has featured concerts by The Offspring, Tenacious D, Foo Fighters, Ozzy Osbourne, Blink-182,  Metallica, Linkin Park, "Weird Al" Yankovic, and Muse. A similar event was the Blizzard Worldwide Invitational, held outside the U.S. from 2004 to 2008.

Pricing
In 2009, the price was raised to $125. For 2010, the price was raised to $150. For 2011, the price was raised to $175 and for 2013 the price remained at $175. For 2014, the price was raised to $199 and the BlizzCon Benefit Dinner went from $500 to $750, which includes admission. From 2015 to 2018, the prices have remained at the 2014 level.

The ticket price includes a goody bag that contains items such as in-game prizes, beta keys for upcoming Blizzard games and exclusive Blizzard paraphernalia.

BlizzCon was not held in 2006, 2012, The event was also cancelled in 2020 due to the ongoing COVID-19 pandemic. The event was also not held in 2022, during the period which Activision Blizzard was under legal litigation related to workplace harassment issues by federal and state agencies; Blizzard stated that instead of holding the event, they will be using the time "supporting our teams and progressing development of our games and experiences".

BlizzCon events

2000s

2005
Attendees were able to try one of the two new playable races, the Blood Elves, for upcoming expansion based in Outland which was released as World of Warcraft: The Burning Crusade in 2007. Playable demos of the single and multiplayer modes of the since canceled Starcraft: Ghost were available. A songwriting competition was judged by Jonathan Davis of Korn.

Level 60 Elite Tauren Chieftain, comedian Christian Finnegan, and The Offspring performed at the closing concert.

2007

A pre-release version of StarCraft II was available for play (the game would be released as StarCraft II: Wings of Liberty only in 2010), as single player or 2v2 as Terran or Protoss. Much of the game was revealed and explained as well as Q&A with attendees. The Zerg race was, however, not unveiled at that time. The second expansion to World of Warcraft, titled Wrath of the Lich King, was officially announced and it was available to play.

Comedian Jay Mohr entertained at the closing ceremony followed by Level 70 Elite Tauren Chieftain (who changed their name to reflect the new level cap in The Burning Crusade) alongside Video Games Live performing at the closing concert.

2008

In the opening ceremonies, Blizzard president Michael Morhaime revealed the third playable class for Diablo III: the Wizard, as well as the major announcement that Starcraft II would be separated into three games.

Playable versions of Diablo III, StarCraft II, and World of Warcraft: Wrath of the Lich King were available to test during the convention.  As well, there were tournaments and competitions for the World of Warcraft Trading Card Game, World of Warcraft miniatures game, StarCraft, StarCraft II, Warcraft III: The Frozen Throne, and World of Warcraft arena. The Zerg race was now playable in the StarCraft II demos.

BlizzCon 2008 was broadcast live on both days as a PPV event on DirecTV for US viewers only, for eight hours per day in high definition. Official Blizzard fansite WoW Radio broadcast live audio via SHOUTcast.

For the closing ceremonies on Saturday, comedians Kyle Kinane and Patton Oswalt performed. The closing concert was performed by Video Games Live, playing arrangements from all of the Blizzard games, and a performance including the Wrath of the Lich King music.

2009

In an attempt to reduce frustrations linked to lack of ticket availability for previous BlizzCons, there were four halls (increased from three) of space available. Blizzard implemented a new system designed to make buying tickets easier. The new system implemented an online queue, effectively creating an organized online "line" for anyone who wants to purchase tickets, an improvement on 2008's chaotic sale of tickets.

As in 2008, DirecTV carried both days of BlizzCon 2009 as a PPV event ($39.95 for both days) for eight hours per day in both standard and high definition. All BlizzCon 2009 Pay Per View event purchasers received an exclusive "Grunty the Murloc Marine" World of Warcraft in-game pet. and had access to the online stream for no additional cost. New in 2009, BlizzCon was broadcast live via an internet stream, calling it a "Virtual Ticket". The site covered both days of the convention featuring exclusive interviews and commentary, main stage presentations including the opening ceremony and tournament coverage with team highlights. All purchasers received an exclusive "Grunty the Murloc Marine" World of Warcraft in-game pet.

The third expansion, World of Warcraft: Cataclysm was announced. Diablo III, StarCraft II: Wings of Liberty were available to play.

Ozzy Osbourne performed for the closing concert.

2010s

2010

The fifth playable Diablo III class was revealed to be the Demon Hunter and the StarCraft II modification called "Blizzard DotA" was presented, which later evolved into Heroes of the Storm. Diablo III, StarCraft II: Wings of Liberty and World of Warcraft: Cataclysm were playable.

Similar to 2009, BlizzCon 2010 was available live via an online broadcast on the "BlizzCon Virtual Ticket". The Virtual Ticket provided four live feeds from the convention floor, offering 50+ hours of HD BlizzCon programming. DirecTV again offered both days of BlizzCon 2010 as a PPV event (US$39.95 for both days) for ten hours per day in both standard and high definition.

Korean pro-gamer MVP_Genius won the StarCraft II BlizzCon Invitational The vinyl record Revolution Overdrive: Songs of Liberty was released for the event.

Tenacious D (Jack Black/Kyle Gass) played for the closing concert with Dave Grohl. Recordings of the event were released for free as part of the Live Music Archive.

2011
The opening ceremony showcased a new Diablo III cinematic trailer titled "The Black Soulstone", a StarCraft II: Heart of the Swarm reveal trailer showcasing new units and abilities, a "Blizzard DOTA" trailer for a new game made from StarCraft II and the reveal of World of Warcraft: Mists of Pandaria, a new expansion for World of Warcraft. Diablo III, StarCraft II: Heart of the Swarm, and World of Warcraft: Mists of Pandaria were playable. DirecTV once again offered both days of BlizzCon 2011 as a PPV event.

The GOMTV Global Starcraft II League October final match took place in Anaheim alongside BlizzCon. Moon "MMA" Sung Won beat Jeong "Mvp" Jong Hyeon, 4–1.

The closing concert featured a performance from Blizzard's own in-house band, The Artist Formerly Known as Level 80 Elite Tauren Chieftains (TAFKL80ETC), who changed their name mid-concert to Level 90 Elite Tauren Chieftains (L90ETC). The Foo Fighters performed for the closing concert.

2013
Blizzcon 2013 was announced to be held on November 8 and 9 in Anaheim. The tickets were sold in two batches, on April 24 and 27, 2013, and both batches quickly sold out. Blizzard also sold special tickets that include access to a pre-Blizzcon Benefit Dinner. These limited tickets cost $500 each, with all money collected from the pre-Blizzcon Benefit Dinner being donated to Children's Hospital of Orange County, CA. Blizzard once again sold a Virtual Ticket for live online streaming of all of the events in BlizzCon 2013.

The Heroes of the Storm "Cinematic Trailer" was presented with an alpha version of the game available for playing.   Hearthstone's was announced to begin beta testing and that the game would be released on iOS and Android. The fifth expansion to World of Warcraft, Warlords of Draenor, was officially announced and a trailer was shown. The Warcraft film concept art was shown.  Diablo III: Reaper of Souls was announced to be released on PC and PS4.

The gaming events included the finals of the 2013 StarCraft II World Championship Series as well as the Hearthstone Innkeeper's Invitational, a Hearthstone: Heroes of Warcraft tournament featuring a handful of prominent Twitch streamers. The StarCraft II competition was won by Kim "sOs" Yoo-jin, World of Warcraft arena was won by team Skill-Capped and Hearthstone was won by Dan "Artosis" Stemkoski.

The closing concert was performed by Blink-182.

2014

The tickets went on sale May 7 and 10, 2014. In addition, a limited number of tickets went on sale May 15 for $750 with proceeds benefiting Children's Hospital of Orange County, this included admission. For 2014, tickets were sold via Eventbrite instead of the Blizzard Store. Blizzard once again sold a Virtual Ticket for live online streaming of all of the events.

Overwatch, a new class-based multi-player shooter, was announced on November 7, 2014. The third part of Starcraft II, Legacy of the Void was announced. The first expansion pack for Hearthstone, Goblins vs. Gnomes, was also announced on the same day. The first Hearthstone World Championship was hosted at the event.

The 2014 StarCraft II World Championship Series Global Finals was won by Lee "Life" Seung Hyun beating Mun "MMA" Seong Won. The World of Warcraft championship was won by team Bleached Bones. Hearthstone was won by James "Firebat" Kostesich and first official tournament in Heroes of the Storm was held at the event that was won by team Cloud 9.

The closing ceremony concert was opened by Level 90 Elite Tauren Chieftains (changed their name during the show to Elite Tauren Chieftains) and closed by Metallica.

2015

The tickets went on sale on April 15 and 18 using Eventbrite, and were sold out nearly instantly. Blizzard once again sold a Virtual Ticket for live online streaming of all of the events held at BlizzCon. The convention's online broadcast was watched by over 10 million people.

Hearthstone'''s third adventure, League of Explorers, was announced on November 6, 2015, which was later released on November 12. Overwatch was announced to have a Q2 2016 release date, later confirmed for May 24. The expansion World of Warcraft: Legion released its cinematic trailer and announced a release date on or before September 21, 2016 and was playable. The Warcraft (film) released its first official trailer and revealed its release date of June 10, 2016. StarCraft II was announced to have upcoming single player mission packs, Nova Covert Ops, which each consist of three missions.

The 2015 Heroes of the Storm World Championship and the second Hearthstone World Championship were hosted at the event. Hearthstone was won by Sebastian "Ostkaka" Engwall and Heroes of the Storm was won by team Cloud 9 again. The 2015 StarCraft II World Championship Series Global Finals was won by Kim "sOs" Yoo-jin beating last year's winner Lee "Life" Seung Hyun and becoming the first two-time StarCraft II World Championship Series world champion. The World of Warcraft arena team championship was won by SK Gaming.

The closing concert was performed by Linkin Park.

2016
BlizzCon 2016, also known as BlizzCon X, was the tenth BlizzCon event. Its tickets were sold on April 20 and 23 using the ticketing service Universe. Blizzard offered a Virtual Ticket for live online streaming of all of the esports events and major panels, remaining at the $39.99 price. Other panels and interviews in smaller rooms were not included for streaming.

In September 2016, Blizzard Entertainment released a sneak peek at the BlizzCon 2016 in-game item rewards and offered for the first time the "goody bag", normally only for physical attendees, was offered for sale to virtual ticket holders.

The fourth expansion for Hearthstone, Mean Streets of Gadgetzan, was announced on November 4, 2016, and was later released on December 1, 2016.Overwatch officially announced the hero Sombra, Blizzard announced the creation of an official esports league for Overwatch. It was announced that Diablo III would include a remake of Diablo and the necromancer hero class would be added in a DLC.

The gaming events at BlizzCon 2016 included the 2016 StarCraft II World Championship Series Global Finals won by Byun "ByuN" Hyun Woo, the World of Warcraft arena championship, the Hearthstone third world championship, the Heroes of the Storm fall championship, and the Overwatch World Cup.

Kristian Nairn, who played Hodor on the HBO series Game of Thrones, was the DJ during Blizzard's 25th anniversary party. The closing ceremony concert was performed by "Weird Al" Yankovic.

2017

On March 14, Blizzard Entertainment announced that BlizzCon 2017 would be held on November 3 and 4, with tickets being available to purchase on April 5 and 8 using the ticketing service Universe. A third round of tickets were sold on July 5 due to the convention center adding a new hall. The prices for both admission and the benefit dinner remained at $199 and $750 respectively. On September 13, 2017, Virtual Tickets began being sold; this ticket included a faction-specific flying mount in World of Warcraft, and other special items in the various Blizzard games.

Blizzcon 2017 had a record number of more than 35,000 attendees due to a recently completed expansion of the Anaheim Convention Center.

The gaming announcements included that the next expansion to World of Warcraft would be Battle for Azeroth, there would be official World of Warcraft Classic servers, a new hero for Overwatch named Moira was added as well as a new map called "Blizzard World", StarCraft II: Wings of Libertys first campaign, multiplayer and other modes of the game are now free, and Hearthstones next expansion would be "Kobolds and Catacombs" and that it would be released in December 2017.

The esports events at BlizzCon 2017 included the 2017 StarCraft II World Championship Series Global Finals won by Lee "Rogue" Byung Ryul, the World of Warcraft arena championship won by ABC, the Hearthstone Inn-vitational won by the Grimestreet Grifters, the Heroes of the Storm HGC Finals won by MVP Black, the Overwatch World Cup won by South Korea for the second time, and StarCraft: Remastered Ultimate Title Fight won by Bisu.

The closing concert was performed by Muse.

2018
Blizzard Entertainment announced that BlizzCon 2018 would be held on November 2 and 3 at the Anaheim Convention Center, with tickets being available to purchase from Universe.com on May 9 and 12. A third round of tickets went on sale on August 18. The price for admission remained at $199 while a virtual ticket option was offered for $49.99.

The announcements on the first day included Warcraft III: Reforged, a remaster of Warcraft III: Reign of Chaos and its expansion, The Frozen Throne, with a release sometime in 2019; Ashe, a new Western-themed hero for Overwatch; Orphea, daughter of the Raven Lord, the first original character for Heroes of the Storm, who will be given free to attendees and Virtual Ticket holders; the Rastakhan's Rumble expansion for Hearthstone;<ref>{{cite web|url=https://venturebeat.com/2018/11/02/hearthstones-next-expansion-is-rastakhans-rumble/|title=Hearthstone's Hearthstone's next expansion is Rastakhans Rumble|date=November 2, 2018|access-date=November 2, 2018|archive-url=https://web.archive.org/web/20181103052323/https://venturebeat.com/2018/11/02/hearthstones-next-expansion-is-rastakhans-rumble/|archive-date=November 3, 2018|url-status=live}}</ref> World of Warcraft Classic, which had a playable demo available for both attendees and Virtual Ticket holders, will be released in the middle of 2019, and will be included in the regular World of Warcraft subscription; and Diablo: Immortal, an action role-playing game for mobile devices. The announcement of Diablo: Immortal was poorly received by attendees and Blizzard fans across the board, resulting in a high number of dislikes on the YouTube gameplay and cinematic trailers, and considerable criticism from gaming journalists, streamers, and the YouTube community.

The esports events at BlizzCon 2018 included the StarCraft II World Championship Series Global Finals won by Joona "Serral" Sotala, the World of Warcraft Arena World Championship won by Method Orange, the World of Warcraft Mythic Dungeon Invitational All-Stars won by Free Marsy, the Hearthstone Global Games won by the China team, the Heroes of the Storm Global Championship won by Gen.G, and the Overwatch World Cup won by South Korea for its third time.

Closing festivities included three simultaneous concerts by Train, Kristian Nairn, and Lindsey Stirling.

2019
Blizzard Entertainment announced that BlizzCon 2019 would be held on November 1 and 2 at the Anaheim Convention Center, with tickets being available to purchase from AXS.com on May 4 and 8. In lieu of the traditional "goodie bag," convention attendees will be able to choose between an orc grunt or human footman statue to commemorate 25 years of Warcraft. The price for admission was raised to $229, with a "Portal Pass" option being available for $550. This new Portal Pass offers several perks, such as early access to the Darkmoon Faire, access to an exclusive lounge with concessions and the opportunity to meet Blizzard employees and esports pros, separate registration lanes, separate security lanes, and early access to the convention center.

The gaming announcements included that Diablo IV is under development, Overwatch 2 was confirmed, a World of Warcraft expansion called Shadowlands will be out in 2020, and the Hearthstone expansion Descent of Dragons and a new game mode called Battlegrounds will be released in December 2019.

The esports events at BlizzCon 2019 included the Overwatch World Cup that was won by the United States, StarCraft II WCS Global Finals won by Park "Dark" Ryung Woo, the World of Warcraft Arena World Championship won by Method Black, and the World of Warcraft Mythic Dungeon International won by Method EU, and the Hearthstone Grandmasters Global Finals won by VKLiooon, the first female to win Grandmasters in that game.

Closing festivities included three simultaneous concerts by The Glitch Mob, Haywyre, and Fitz and the Tantrums (the last concert was viewable for attendees only).

2020s

2020
In April 2020, Blizzard announced that they were still working on plans for the next Blizzcon, noting that it may occur in some other form or be cancelled entirely due to the COVID-19 pandemic. In May 2020, Blizzard confirmed they will not hold the physical event, but was considering some online replacement which would not likely occur until early 2021.

2021
On September 21, 2020, Blizzard announced that the virtual event BlizzConline would be held from February 19–20, 2021. It featured the unveilings of Diablo II: Resurrected and the remastered version of The Burning Crusade expansion for World of Warcraft Classic, and further details on Overwatch 2 and Diablo Immortal.

In May 2021, Blizzard announced that BlizzCon as an in-person event would be cancelled once again due to COVID-19, as the "ongoing complexities and uncertainties of the pandemic" made it impossible to organize an event at the required scale for its traditional November scheduling. Blizzard stated that there were plans for a "global event" with online components and "smaller in-person gatherings" to be held in early 2022.

2022 
On October 26, 2021, amid, but without specifically mentioning ongoing litigation against the company over its workplace culture and treatment of female employees, Blizzard announced that the previously announced "global event" had been "paused", and that it would "take the time to reimagine what a BlizzCon event of the future could look like."

Blizzard WorldWide Invitational
Blizzard WorldWide Invitationals were events similar to BlizzCon held outside the United States.

References

External links
 
 

Video game trade shows
Blizzard Entertainment
Recurring events established in 2005
Gaming conventions
StarCraft competitions
2005 establishments in California